Best of Gloria Estefan is the third solo compilation album released by American singer Gloria Estefan after "Exitos" and "Gloria Estefan Greatest Hits", but is the twentieth overall, released in 1997. The compilation was released only in France and Switzerland.

Release
This compilation was initially an exclusive release in France. The compilation was re-released in France, Switzerland, and the Benelux countries following the success of the single "You'll Be Mine (Party Time)" 

This album peaked number three on the French album chart and is Estefan's highest peaking album in the country.

No singles were released to promote the compilation.

Track listing

Charts

Certifications and sales

References

External links
 Gloria Estefan Discography Database via archive.org

1997 compilation albums
Gloria Estefan compilation albums
Albums produced by Emilio Estefan